Baccharis aretioides is a species of flowering plant in the family Asteraceae that is endemic to Ecuador. Its natural habitat is subtropical or tropical high-altitude grassland. It is threatened by habitat loss.

References

aretioides
Endemic flora of Ecuador
Critically endangered flora of South America
Taxonomy articles created by Polbot
Taxa named by Nikolai Turczaninow